Tanduo is a small village in Tawau Division, Sabah, Malaysia. The village is located about 37 kilometres from Lahad Datu town. It is the site of where the 2013 Lahad Datu standoff happens with the village today has been transformed into a military camp.

Villages in Sabah